Claire Liu was the defending champion but chose not to participate.

Taylor Townsend won the title, defeating Wang Xiyu in the final, 6–3, 6–2.

Seeds

Draw

Finals

Top half

Bottom half

References

Main Draw

LTP Charleston Pro Tennis - Singles